Education in the Andaman and Nicobar islands, the Indian archipelago in the Bay of Bengal are mainly Public or a Trust owned institutes.

Andaman & Nicobar Islands has 396 schools scattered across 36 islands. 306 are overseen by the Department of Education, 02 by Kendriya Vidhyalaya Sangatan, 02 by Navodaya Vidhyalaya Samiti, 2 are aided schools, 02 by Municipal Council, and 71 are privately managed. In 2003, the Zilla Parishad developed five elementary schools in Port Mout, Kadamatala, Basantipur, Pahalgaon, and Diglipur in conjunction with Vivekananda Kendra.

24 of the 306 government schools are in tribal communities. As of September 30, 2008, these schools had a total of 85267 pupils, including 6018 aboriginal children. Education is available in five languages: English, Hindi, Tamil, Telugu, and Bengali. Majority of the Secondary and Senior Secondary schools are affiliated to CBSE (Central Board of Secondary Education).

References

Andaman and Nicobar Islands